Essary Springs is an unincorporated community and census-designated place (CDP) in Hardeman County, Tennessee, United States. It was first listed as a CDP prior to the 2020 census.

It is in the southeast corner of the county, bordered to the east by McNairy County and to the south by the state of Mississippi. The Hatchie River flows south to north through the community, eventually turning west to join the Mississippi River west of Covington.

Demographics

References 

Census-designated places in Hardeman County, Tennessee
Census-designated places in Tennessee